Hezuo (Zö) city is the administrative seat of the Gannan Tibetan Autonomous Prefecture (TAP) in southern Gansu province in Northwestern China. It is home to the Gêndên Qöling (Zö Gönba) and its Milaraiba Tower, the Langshangmaio Temple, and a mosque. There is a breed of pig, the Zoi Swine (a.k.a. Silverweed Pig), from here and the whole Gannan TAP also.

Name
The Tibetan name "Zö"  is pronounced Dzoi in Standard Tibetan and pronounced Hdzoi/Hdzu in local dialect.

The Chinese name before the 1950s was "Heicuo", a transliteration of the Tibetan name. In 1956, the name was changed to the similar-sounding "Hezuo", meaning "cooperation", which reflected the desire to bring unity and harmony to Hezuo.

History
Originally a rare populated wetland, mass city-construction began in the 1950s.

During 1953, the Gannan Tibetan Autonomous Prefecture was created, and the town of Hezuo (not yet a city) was part of it.

In May 1956, Hezuo was named by a provincial government employee.

During June 1996, the government announced the establishment of Hezuo, and on January 1, 1998, the city was officially established.

Population 
The total population of Hezuo city in 2010 was 81,000. The rural population was 35,000, about for 43% of the total population, and the 57% of the urban population was 46,000. 54% of the population is Tibetan, which is about 44,000.

The city's permanent population was 95,000 at the end of 2017. Urban population is 51,000, the rate of urbanization was 57.10 percent. The natural population growth rate was 9.57 percent. Birth rate was 15.09 percent. Population mortality rate was 5.52 percent, 0-14 year old population is 19,500, and the population of 15-64 years old is 67,200.

At the end of 2019, the registered population of Hezuo City was 93,727.

Nationalities

There are Tibetan, Han, Hui, Salar, Dongxiang, Baoan, Manchu, Tu, Mongolian, Yugu, Koreans and other ethnic groups in Hezuo city.

Natural resources 
In Hezuo city, yaks and Tibetan sheep are the major animals, with total of about 300,000, about 250,000 yaks and Tibetan sheep remain at the end of year. Beside two major animal, Hezuo also have a famous animal called the Juema Pig (蕨麻豬). The major trees in Hezuo are fir, spruce, pine, Huashan pine, poplar, birch, cypress, and willow. Shrubs in Hezuo city including sea buckthorn, rhododendron, cypress, plum and catalpa. Highland barley, spring wheat and rapeseed are the normal staple food people eat.

Economic 
In 2020, Hezuo City expects that the city's regional GDP will reach 5.89 billion yuan, 1.8 times the level projected in the twelfth five-year plan. The added value of industrial enterprises above designated size will be 570 million yuan, an average annual growth rate of 5%.

Primary industry

the city's annual primary industry industrial added value was 216.87 million yuan, of which, planting industry was 30.48 million yuan, forestry was 1.11 million yuan, animal husbandry was 184.75 million yuan, and agriculture, forestry, animal husbandry and fishery services were 520,000 yuan.

Secondary industry

In 2017, all industries in Hezuo city industrial production has value of 563.84 million yuan. Industrial production of industries above designated size was 498.84 million yuan. Industrial production of industries below designated size was 65 million yuan. Export delivery value was 6.06 million yuan.

Tertiary industry

At the end of 2018, it received 2.026 million tourists, with a comprehensive tourism income of 1.03 billion yuan. The city has 125 hotels and restaurants, with a total of more than 5,500 guest rooms and more than 10,000 beds.

Geography and climate
Most of the annual precipitation is delivered from May to September. With monthly percent possible sunshine ranging from 44% in June and September to 71% in December, the city receives 2,370 hours of bright sunshine annually.

Administrative divisions
Hezuo City (合作市) has four subdistricts, three towns and three townships.

Subdistricts
 Dangzhou Subdistrict
 Yiheang Subdistrict
 Jianmukeer Subdistrict
 Tongqin Subdistrict

Towns
 Nawu
 Lexiu
 Zogamanma

Townships
 Kajman Township
 Kajiadao
 Zuogedoma

Transport 
China National Highway 213
Gannan Xiahe Airport, 56 kilometers from Zoi was started September 2010 and completed in August 2013.
The planned Lanzhou–Hezuo railway will terminate here

References

External links 
  

Cities in Gansu
Gannan Tibetan Autonomous Prefecture
County-level divisions of Gansu